William McGovern (born 2 January 1937) is a British former racing driver.

McGovern is best known for becoming the first person to win three British Touring Car Championship (then known as the British Saloon Car Championship) driver titles. He won three consecutive titles between 1970 and 1972 with a George Bevan-prepared Sunbeam Imp.

Racing record

Complete British Saloon Car Championship results
(key) (Races in bold indicate pole position; races in italics indicate fastest lap.)

† Events with 2 races staged for the different classes.

References

External links

1937 births
Living people
Irish racing drivers
Scottish racing drivers
Irish people of Scottish descent
British Touring Car Championship drivers
British Touring Car Championship Champions